The 2008 Rolex 24 at Daytona was the first round of the 2008 Rolex Sports Car Series season and the 46th running of the 24 Hours of Daytona. It took place at Daytona International Speedway between January 26–27, 2008.

Qualifying
In the Daytona Prototype class, pole position was taken by Oswaldo Negri Jr. in the #60 Michael Shank Racing Ford powered Riley Mk. XI with a laptime of 1:40.793. Teammate A. J. Allmendinger locked out the front row for Michael Shank Racing. In the Grand Touring class, the #70 SpeedSource Mazda RX-8 GT with Sylvain Tremblay was fastest with a laptime of 1:50.788. The #56 Mastercar Ferrari F430 Challenge qualified 2nd in the team's debut at Daytona.

Race
The #01 Telmex Chip Ganassi Racing with Felix Sabates Lexus-powered Riley of Scott Pruett, Memo Rojas, Dario Franchitti, and Juan Pablo Montoya led 252 laps and gave Chip Ganassi racing their 3rd successive win at the Daytona 24 Hours. The #01 team took the overall victory by a margin of 2 laps over the #99 GAINSCO/Bob Stallings Racing Pontiac-powered Riley entry. At the start, many cars (including the eventual race winner) had to start from pit lane after changing their tires from wets to slicks. The #70 SpeedSource Mazda RX-8 GT of Sylvain Tremblay, Nick Ham, David Haskell, and Raphael Matos were the winners in GT, completing 664 laps and finishing 9th overall. The overall pace of the race was slowed due to wet weather during the night.

A total of 22 safety car periods neutralized the race for 112 laps.

Race results
Class winners in bold.

References

External links
 Official race results
 Race results

24 Hours of Daytona
Daytona
24 Hours of Daytona